Savilian may refer to:

Henry Savile (Bible translator) (1549-1622), English scholar
Savilian Professor, the professorships he founded at Oxford, namely:
Savilian Professor of Astronomy
Savilian Professor of Geometry